The Dintel is a river in North Brabant that runs from Oudenbosch to Standdaarbuiten.

It originates in Belgium as the Mark.

History 
The Dintel is mentioned in the 13th century as the name Dindel or Dindele. After the St. Elizabeth's flood (1421) the Dintel was considered more of a sea than a river. After the surrounding land was further drained the Dintel became narrower. The Dintel, ended with locks in the early 19th century. Thus disappeared the tide of Dintel.

Rivers of North Brabant
Rivers of the Netherlands
Moerdijk
Steenbergen